is a passenger railway station located in the town of Ichinomiya, Chiba Prefecture Japan, operated by the East Japan Railway Company (JR East).

Lines
Only local services stop at this station.

Station layout
The station consists of two opposed side platforms serving two tracks, connected to the station building by a footbridge. The station is unattended.

Platforms

History
Torami Station opened on 15 December 1925. Freight operations were discontinued on 1 October 1962. The station has been unstaffed since 1 July 1972. The station was absorbed into the JR East network upon the privatization of the Japanese National Railways (JNR) on 1 April 1987. The station building was reconstructed between 2006 and 2007.

Passenger statistics
In fiscal 2006, the station was used by an average of 81 passengers daily.

Surrounding area
 
 Ichinomiya Town Torami Elementary School

See also
 List of railway stations in Japan

References

External links

 Torami Station information (JR East) 

Railway stations in Japan opened in 1925
Railway stations in Chiba Prefecture
Sotobō Line
Stations of East Japan Railway Company
Ichinomiya, Chiba